William Warren Bartley III (October 2, 1934 – February 5, 1990), known as W. W. Bartley III, was an American philosopher specializing in 20th century philosophy, language and logic, and the Vienna Circle.

Early life and education
Born in Wilkinsburg, Pennsylvania, on October 2, 1934, Bartley was brought up in a Protestant home. He completed his secondary education in Pittsburgh and studied at Harvard University between 1952 and 1956, graduating with a BA degree in philosophy. While an undergraduate at Harvard, he was an editor at The Harvard Crimson newspaper.  He spent the winter semester of 1956 and the summer semester of 1957 at the Harvard Divinity School and the Episcopal Theological School in Cambridge, Massachusetts. In 1958, he completed his MA degree in philosophy at Harvard. Bartley was training to become a Protestant minister, but rejected Christianity at that point. He went on to study under Sir Karl Popper at the London School of Economics, where he completed his PhD in 1962. Parts of his dissertation, Limits of Rationality: A Critical Study of Some Logical Problems of Contemporary Pragmatism and Related Movements, were subsequently published as The Retreat to Commitment in the same year.

Career
After his doctoral graduation, Bartley worked as a lecturer in logic in London. In the following years, he held positions at the Warburg Institute and the University of California, San Diego. He began teaching at the University of Pittsburgh in 1963, and was appointed to his first full professorship there in 1969.

In 1973, he joined the California State University, Hayward faculty as a professor of philosophy, where he received the distinction of "Outstanding Professor" of the entire California State University system in 1979. His last position there before his retirement was that of a senior research fellow at the Hoover Institution.

Relationship with Sir Karl Popper
Bartley and Popper had a great admiration for each other, partly because of their common stand against justificationism. However, at the International Colloquium in the Philosophy of Science at Bedford College, University of London, July 11–17, 1965, they came into conflict with each other. Bartley had presented a paper, "Theories of Demarcation Between Science and Metaphysics," in which he accused Popper of displaying a positivist attitude in his early works and proposed that Popper's demarcation criterion was not as important as Popper thought it was. Popper took this as a personal attack, and Bartley took his reply as indicating that Popper was ignoring his criticism. Their friendship was not restored until 1974, after the publication of The Philosophy of Karl Popper (edited by Paul Schillpp). Bartley changed the tone of his remarks about Popper's criterion of demarcation, making it less aggressive. However, despite the restored friendship, Bartley's view was never accepted by Popper, who criticised it even after Bartley's death.

Author and editor
Bartley published a biography of the philosopher Ludwig Wittgenstein, titled simply Wittgenstein, in 1973. The book contained a relatively brief, 4–5 page treatment of Wittgenstein's homosexuality, relying mainly on reportage from the philosopher's friends and acquaintances. This matter caused enormous controversy in intellectual and philosophical circles; many perceived it as a posthumous "attack" on Wittgenstein.  Some foreign translations of the book, such as the first edition of the Spanish translation, omitted the "offending" material. In the second edition of the biography (La Salle, Illinois: Open Court, 1985, pp. 159–97), Bartley answered the objections of critics, pointing out that Wittgenstein's periods of active homosexuality are verified by the philosopher's own private writings, including his coded diaries, and that extensive confirmation was also available from people who knew Wittgenstein in Vienna between the two World Wars, including ex-lovers. Bartley also considered, and rejected, the idea of a connection between the private life and the philosophy.

Bartley also wrote a biography of Werner Erhard, the founder of est. Bartley was graduate of Erhard Seminars Training and served on the advisory board of Est, an educational company.

Bartley edited Lewis Carroll's book Symbolic Logic (see symbolic logic), including the second volume, which Carroll had never published.

Bartley extended Popperian epistemology in his book The Retreat to Commitment, in which he describes pancritical rationalism (PCR), a development of critical rationalism and panrationalism. PCR attempts to work around the problem of ultimate commitment or infinite regress by decoupling criticism and justification.  A pancritical rationalist holds all positions open to criticism, including PCR, and never resorts to authority for justification.

Parts of Popper's Realism and the Aim of Science, a book that Bartley edited, and the Addendum to the fourth edition of The Open Society and Its Enemies contain passages that are commonly interpreted as Popper's acceptance of Bartley's views. Mariano Artigas held that these were in fact written by Bartley himself.

Alan Ebenstein, a biographer of F. A. Hayek, criticized Bartley for the extent of the changes he made as the editor of The Fatal Conceit, a book attributed to Hayek. Bruce Caldwell suggests that the book in its published form may actually have been written by Bartley.

Death
Bartley died of bladder cancer on February 5, 1990, at his home in Oakland, California, after having been diagnosed with the disease in the middle of the preceding year.

At the time of his death, Bartley had just finished his last book, Unfathomed Knowledge, Unmeasured Wealth: On Universities and the Wealth of Nations. Other works he was preparing at that time included writing a biography, and editing the collected works, of Friedrich Hayek. The latter was being completed after Bartley's death by his colleague and executor Stephen Kresge.  Also unfinished was a biography of Popper. Both biographies were in an advanced stage at the time of Bartley's death.

Bibliography
 The Retreat to Commitment, 1962
 Morality and Religion, 1971
 Lewis Carroll's Symbolic Logic, 1977
 Wittgenstein, 1973, 1985
 Ludwig Wittgenstein e Karl Popper: maestri di scuola elementare, 1976
 Come demarcare la scienza della metafisica, 1983
 Werner Erhard, The Transformation of a Man: The Founding of est, 1978
 The Fatal Conceit: The Errors of Socialism, 1988 (editor, with F. A. Hayek)
 Rehearsing a revolution – Karl Popper: A Life, 1989
 Unfathomed Knowledge, Unmeasured Wealth, 1990

See also
 American philosophy
 List of American philosophers

References

External links

, William Warren Bartley III (1934–1990)
 clublet.com, "Often referred to on Why simply as Bartley."
 about the philosophers, Bill Bartley (1934–1990)
 Pancritical Rationalism: An Extropic Metacontext for Memetic Progress
 The Bartley Institute (by Stephen Kresge, Bartley's executor)
 
 

1934 births
1990 deaths
Harvard Divinity School alumni
Alumni of the London School of Economics
Academics of the Warburg Institute
University of California, San Diego faculty
University of Pittsburgh faculty
California State University, East Bay faculty
20th-century American philosophers
Critical rationalists
Deaths from bladder cancer
Philosophers from Pennsylvania
Philosophers from California
People from Wilkinsburg, Pennsylvania
Deaths from cancer in California
Member of the Mont Pelerin Society